Donatella is a 1956 Italian comedy film directed by Mario Monicelli. At the 6th Berlin International Film Festival Elsa Martinelli won the Silver Bear for Best Actress.

Plot
Donatella is a simple and honest Roman girl, daughter of a bookbinder and girlfriend of Guido, a gas station owner. One day she finds a woman's handbag containing valuables and documents, and decides to return it to her owner, a wealthy American lady who offers Donatella a job as a secretary as a reward: she has to manage the lady's villa during her absences, a job that does not require any particular commitment and allows Donatella to live for a while in the high society, unknown to her. Donatella casually meets Maurizio, a rich, elegant and well-educated young man, and ends up falling in love. When Maurizio discovers the humble origins of Donatella, he thinks that she has deceived him; but then he is convinced of Donatella's good faith, and thanks also to Guido's honesty, who acknowledges that he is not the right man for Donatella and agrees to leave her free, Donatella and Maurizio end up marrying.

Cast
 Elsa Martinelli as Donatella
 Gabriele Ferzetti as Maurizio
 Walter Chiari as Guido
 Liliana Bonfatti as The veterinarian's nurse
 Alan Furlan as Giancarlo
 Virgilio Riento
 Giuseppe Porelli as Pasquale
 Giovanna Pala
 Aldo Fabrizi as Donatella's father
 Gaby André
 Xavier Cugat as himself
 Abbe Lane as herself

References

External links

Donatella at Variety Distribution

1956 films
1956 comedy films
Italian comedy films
1950s Italian-language films
Films set in Rome
Films directed by Mario Monicelli
Films with screenplays by Ruggero Maccari
1950s Italian films